"Cântă cucu-n Bucovina" or "Cântă cucu în Bucovina" is a Romanian folk song, more precisely a doină, composed in 1904 by . The lyrics are original, while the melody is a modified Bukovinian mourning song. Mandicevschi composed it at the request of Spiru Haret for the 400th anniversary of the death of Stephen the Great, which was commemorated in Putna (then in Austria-Hungary) in the same year. The song is also known as "Cântă cucul, bată-l vina", "Bucovină, plai cu flori", "Cântec pentru Bucovina" and "Cântec despre Bucovina".

Famous singers of the song include Grigore Leșe and Valentina Naforniță. The song was sung in 2022 by a children's choir at the Antim Monastery during a meeting between the Georgian ambassador to Romania  and the Romanian Orthodox bishop  in which the latter gave the former the Order of St. Anthim the Iberian.

The lyrics of the song, on the version "Cântă cucul, bată-l vina" by Leșe, are the following:

References

External links
 

1904 songs
Romanian folk music
Bukovina
Romanian-language songs